Kensaku (written: 健作, 謙作 or 憲作) is a masculine Japanese given name. Notable people with the name include:

, Japanese footballer
, Japanese actor and entertainer
, Japanese actor, singer and politician
, Japanese general
, Japanese footballer
, Japanese Go player
, pen name of Asakura Kikuo, Japanese writer
, Japanese basketball coach

Japanese masculine given names